Occupation: Rock Star is the second release by Boston hard rock band Halfcocked. It was released by Curve of the Earth in April 2000. The album won a Boston Music Award (BMA) for Outstanding Debut Album (Indie Label).

Track listing
"Wrecking Ball" – 3:18 (Charlee Johnson, Tommy O'Neil, Sarah Reitkopp)
"I Lied" – 3:54 (Johnny Heatley, Reikopp)
"Devil Shoes" – 2:22 (Johnson, Reitkopp)
"All by Myself" – 3:00 (Jhen Kobran, Reitkopp)
"Glitter" – 3:43 (Johnson, Reitkopp)
"Drive Away" – 3:09 (Heatley, Reikopp)
"Comes Down" – 3:09 (Kobran, Reitkopp)
"Sell Out" – 3:50 (Heatley, Reikopp)
"V.I.P." – 4:22 (O'Neil, Reitkopp)
"Breakdown" – 4:00 (Johnson, Reitkopp)
"I Lied" (Arena edit) – 6:02 (Heatley, Reikopp)

Personnel

Sarah Reitkopp : Singer
Tommy O'Neil : Guitar
Johnny Rock Heatley : Guitar
Jhen Kobran : Bass, backing vocals
Charlee Johnson : Drums
Jaime Richter : Guitar, backing vocals

References

Halfcocked albums
2000 albums